Antonio de Estrada Manrique (died 17 June 1658) was a Roman Catholic prelate who served as Bishop of Palencia (1657–1658).

Biography
On 19 February 1657, Antonio de Estrada Manrique was selected by the King of Spain as Bishop of Palencia and confirmed by Pope Alexander VII on 18 June 1657. In 1657, he was consecrated bishop by Diego Arce Reinoso, Bishop Emeritus of Plasencia. He served as Bishop of Palencia until his death on 17 June 1658.

References

External links and additional sources
 (for Chronology of Bishops) 
 (for Chronology of Bishops) 

17th-century Roman Catholic bishops in Spain
Bishops appointed by Pope Alexander VII
1658 deaths